The 2014–15 season was Atalanta Bergamasca Calcio's fourth consecutive season in Serie A after having been relegated to Serie B at the end of the 2009–10 season.

Players

Squad information

Transfers
Only first-team transfers (mainly players who appeared with the main squad in the previous campaign) are listed. Youth and/or reserve loans are excluded.

In

Total spending:  €8,300,000

Out

Total gaining:  €17,700,000

Competitions

Serie A

League table

Results summary

Results by round

Matches

Coppa Italia

Statistics

Appearances and goals

|-
! colspan="10" style="background:#dcdcdc; text-align:center"| Goalkeepers

|-
! colspan="10" style="background:#dcdcdc; text-align:center"| Defenders

|-
! colspan="10" style="background:#dcdcdc; text-align:center"| Midfielders

|-
! colspan="10" style="background:#dcdcdc; text-align:center"| Forwards

|-
! colspan="10" style="background:#dcdcdc; text-align:center"| Players transferred out during the season

References

Atalanta B.C. seasons
Atalanta